Channel 43 refers to several television stations:
 RCTI, Indonesia on Channel 43 UHF for Jakarta territories.
 THCT43 (THTPCT), Vietnam on Channel 43 UHF for Can Tho province.
 QRT, Vietnam on Channel 43 UHF for Dien Ban, Quang Nam

Canada
The following television stations broadcast on digital or analog channel 43 (UHF frequencies covering 645.25-649.75 MHz) in Canada:
 CBUT-DT in Vancouver, British Columbia
 CHOB-TV in Maskwacis, Alberta
 CHRO-DT-43 in Ottawa, Ontario

The following television stations operate on virtual channel 43 in Canada:
 CHRO-DT-43 in Ottawa, Ontario

See also
 Channel 43 TV stations in Mexico
 Channel 43 digital TV stations in the United States
 Channel 43 virtual TV stations in the United States
 Channel 43 low-power TV stations in the United States

43